FC Haskovo 1957 is a Bulgarian football club based in Haskovo, which currently competes in the A RFG Haskovo, the fourth tier of Bulgarian football. Haskovo's home ground is the Haskovo Stadium, which has a capacity of 9,000 spectators. Haskovo have spent a total of 7 seasons in the Bulgarian elite, most recently in the 2014-15 season. 

After the 2020-21 season, FC Haskovo’s senior team was merged with FC Izvor Gorski Izvor, which itself was moved to Haskovo to form a new club, called Sayana Haskovo. Sayana took Haskovo’s place in the Southeast Third League. The original club was reformed under the name OFC Haskovo.

History

FC Haskovo was an established team in the B PFG, the second division of Bulgarian football, and an almost constant participant in the division for many seasons. It played in A PFG during five separate periods: 1978-1979, 1981–1984, 1990–1991 and 1992-1993. Its greatest success was 8th in 1981-82 season.

It also played in the Regional League between 2009-2012. Haskovo made 3 successive promotions and returned to top level 21 years after their last top flight participation, in 2014.

Their top flight return proved to be difficult. Haskovo only managed to win two games and draw once in the regular season of the 2014-15 season. All seven points came from home games, with no points earned from away games. This placed Haskovo in last place, in the relegation zone. Surprisingly however, Haskovo managed to beat Ludogorets, the three-time defending champions, with a score of 1-0 at Haskovo stadium. In the second phase, Haskovo were prime candidates to be relegated. They managed to beat Lokomotiv Plovdiv, and fellow strugglers Marek at home, as well as drawing against giants Levski, and Slavia. These efforts were however not enough, as the team only managed to obtain 15 points, meaning they were still 17 points behind Lokomotiv Plovdiv, who were the last team to avoid relegation. Thus, Haskovo along with fellow newcomers Marek, were relegated after only one season in the top flight.

Haskovo was supposed to play in B PFG for the 2015-16 season, but they did not obtain a license and decided not to compete. The team disappeared for the next three years, but it was refounded as Haskovo 1957 and started competing in the fourth level of Bulgarian football. The team won the regional A OFG Haskovo league and promoted to the third tier for the 2018-19 season.

Before the start of the 2021-22 season, FC Izvor Gorski Izvor was relocated to the city of Haskovo and was renamed FC Sayana Haskovo. Shortly after that, FC Haskovo was merged into Sayana, to form a new club in Haskovo. The original club was restructured under the name OFC Haskovo, and began competing in the fourth level of Bulgarian football, A RFG Haskovo Province.

Honours
Bulgarian A PFG
8th place 1981–82
Bulgarian B Group
Runners-up: 2013–14
Bulgarian Cup
Semi-finals (1): 1984
Amateur Football League
 Cup of Amateur Football League in 2005

Current squad
As of 1 August 2019

Seasons

League positions

Managers
{|
|-
|valign="top"|

External links 
 Club profile at bgclubs.eu

Association football clubs established in 2009
Haskovo
2009 establishments in Bulgaria
Haskovo